Michael James McDonald (born December 31, 1964) is an American stand-up comedian, actor, screenwriter, and director. He is best known for starring in the sketch comedy show MADtv. McDonald joined the show during the fourth season (1998) and remained in the cast until the end of the thirteenth and penultimate season, having become the longest-tenured cast member.

Early life

McDonald was born in Fullerton, California. He graduated from St. Juliana Catholic Elementary School in Fullerton, and later went to Servite High School in Anaheim, California, and graduated from the University of Southern California with a business degree.
 
After college, a friend took McDonald to see an improv comedy show at The Groundlings Theater.  McDonald quit his job at the bank and enrolled in The Groundlings improv program.  He was a member of the troupe from 1992 to 1997. During that time, he was also involved in writing and directing films for Roger Corman.

Later on, McDonald would guest star in such shows as Seinfeld (in two episodes playing two different parts), Just Shoot Me!, Family Matters, Scrubs and NewsRadio.  He also made brief cameos in all three Austin Powers films. McDonald had a starring role with Will Forte and Nicole Sullivan on the short-lived MTV show Clone High as the voice of Gandhi.

Career

Stand-up comedy
McDonald is currently touring at stand-up comedy clubs across the country. His stand-up comedy special Michael McDonald: Model Citizen premiered on Showtime on October 9, 2010. Filmed in Orange County at the OC Pavilion, it has been described as "Part stand-up comedy, part one man show, this special is for anyone who – like Michael – finds humor in the strange world all around us."

Cougar Town
McDonald was also a writer, director, and producer of the ABC TV series Cougar Town. He directed a number of episodes of the show, including "Letting You Go", "Everything Man", "When a Kid Goes Bad", "Stop Dragging My Heart Around", and "Don't Come Around Here No More". McDonald also wrote the episode "Wake Up Time".

MADtv
McDonald joined the cast of MADtv in 1998, eventually becoming the longest-standing cast member in the show's history (10 seasons). He performed several recurring characters, including Stuart Larkin, Rusty Miller, Marvin Tikvah, Sean Gidcomb, Bible Dude, the Depressed Persian Tow Truck Man, Fightin' Ron, and F. Michael McKrofsky of "Real M*********ing Talk" (replacing Andrew Daly's token white commentator on that sketch).

Much like Darrell Hammond, Phil Hartman, Dan Aykroyd, and Bill Hader on Saturday Night Live, McDonald was the go-to cast member for a litany of impressions, ranging from past and present media stars to world leaders and American political figures.

After 10 years on MADtv, McDonald left the cast, but was a contributing writer and director for the show's final season. McDonald was the last member of the cast to be hired in the 1990s, and the last cast member to have been born in the 1960s, and is the only cast member to have a "best of" clip show special dedicated to him.

Something So Right
McDonald appeared as the lead Carly's assistant in the 1996 sitcom, first appearing in season one episode four, Something About a Family Photo.

Filmography

Film

Television

Stand-up specials

References

External links

1964 births
Male actors from Fullerton, California
American male comedians
American male film actors
American impressionists (entertainers)
American male television actors
American television directors
American television writers
American male television writers
American male voice actors
Living people
Marshall School of Business alumni
20th-century American male actors
21st-century American male actors
American sketch comedians
American stand-up comedians
Comedians from California
Servite High School alumni
Screenwriters from California
20th-century American comedians
21st-century American comedians